The Simple-Minded Murderer is a Swedish drama film which was released to cinemas in Sweden on 12 February 1982, directed by Hans Alfredson, starring Stellan Skarsgård, as the feeble-minded Sven Olsson.

Plot

The story takes place in 1930s Skåne, Sweden, and focuses on Sven, who is hare-lipped and thus can't speak correctly. Most people consider him stupid, and call him an idiot.

The film begins with Sven and a woman, who we later learn is called Anna, driving an old car across the landscape. The sun is setting, and in the sky Sven sees three angels. He and Anna hide in an old house, and while Anna makes herself comfortable, Sven throws a huge, bloodstained blade into a well. He lies down beside Anna and starts his inner monologue about how it all began.

When Sven's mother died, he was "taken care of" by Höglund (Hans Alfredsson), an evil, rich factory owner who is a member of the local Swedish Nazi party, and lives on a farm. Sven must work on Höglund's farm without payment, and sleep among cows in the stables, where he is tormented by a rat. Being very goodhearted, Sven cannot make himself drown the animal once he has caught it, because he simply can't take another life.

Having read the Bible, a gift from his sister, Sven imagines he is visited by three angels from time to time, whom he speaks to in a clear voice, making it clear that this dialog takes place in his own mind. One day he meets the wheelchair-using Anna (Maria Johansson), whom he falls in love with, and having been mistreated at Höglund's, Sven escapes to Anna's family, who gladly take him in. At Anna's house, Sven is finally treated as an adult. He is given a real bed, gets to work at their own farm, and is paid by Anna's father, Mr. Anderson (Per Myrberg), "in real money", as he points out when Höglund comes and wants to take Sven back to his farm. Although Andersson wins the argument, Sven faints from fear.

Sven decides to buy himself a motorcycle, a real Indian. But Höglund, now out for revenge, pulls some strings and uses his contacts to ensure Sven can't get a driver's license. After a long media battle arranged by Anderson, Sven gets his license and starts riding his motorcycle around town. Höglund, however, does not surrender that easily. The Anderssons' farm is thrown in financial crisis, and Höglund's new chauffeur (Gösta Ekman) steals Sven's motorcycle and destroys it.

Anna starts to scream at Sven, in her desperation blaming him for all that has happened. Sven angrily pushes her out of her wheelchair, but immediately regrets it. Furious at Höglund, and all the pain he has put Sven and his loved ones through, Sven takes the blade from Andersson's chaff cutter, and marches off to Höglund's factory, followed by the three angels singing Verdi's Requiem. Attacking Höglund, Sven steals the evil man's car, then picks up Anna on the run, taking her to the deserted house where the movie begins. It begins to dawn and police start to surround the building. The Anderssons beg for Sven's life. A couple of shots are heard, and the film ends with a picture of the sun rising over the southern Swedish landscape.

Cast
Stellan Skarsgård  as Sven
Maria Johansson  as Anna
Hans Alfredson  as Höglund
Per Myrberg  as Andersson
Lena-Pia Bernhardsson  as Mrs. Andersson
Nils Ahlroth  as Månsson
Lars Amble  as Bengt
Carl-Åke Eriksson  as Wallin
Cecilia Walton  as Vera
Wallis Grahn  as Mrs. Höglund
Else-Marie Brandt  as Sven's mother
Gösta Ekman  as The new driver
Carl Billquist  as Flodin
Lena Nyman  as Woman without legs
Björn Andrésen  as Angel

Awards and reception
The film was loved by critics and viewers alike. It won the awards for Best Director (Hans Alfredsson), Best Film and Best Actor (Stellan) at the 18th Guldbagge Awards. Stellan also won the Silver Bear for Best Actor at the 32nd Berlin International Film Festival for his role as Sven.

The well-known Swedish film director Ingmar Bergman also enjoyed the film. Calling it: "A deep indignation, turned into a powerful fairy-tale. Hasse Alfredssons resources seems unlimited and my admiration for his creativity and the wealth of his ideas are absolute".

Production
The story is based on a short chapter in Alfredson's book En ond man (An Evil Man). The chapter was called "Idiotens berättelse" ("The Idiot's Story") and was an inner monologue held by the then nameless narrator. Another inspiration for the movie came when Alfredson first heard Requiem by Giuseppe Verdi, a piece of music he found very powerful and knew he wanted to use in a movie.

Alfredson has stated in an interview that the character of Sven is loosely based on a real person, named Hans, whom he once knew. Höglund is also based on a real person and a scene from the movie, when Höglund throws a poor farmers money into the fireplace on Christmas Eve is based on a true story.

In preparation for the role as the evil Höglund, Alfredson used to curse and stamp on the ground in order to get really angry.

References

 Staffan Schöier & Stefan Hermelin (2005). Hasse & Tage: Svenska Ord & co: Saga & Sanning

External links
 
 

1982 films
1982 drama films
Swedish drama films
1980s Swedish-language films
Films based on Swedish novels
Films directed by Hasse Alfredson
Best Film Guldbagge Award winners
Films whose director won the Best Director Guldbagge Award
Films set in the 1930s
1980s Swedish films